McLeod Elementary School may refer to:

 McLeod Elementary School, located in Groundbirch, British Columbia, Canada, part of School District 59 Peace River South
 McLeod Elementary School, located in Jackson, Mississippi, United States, part of the Jackson Public School District